Pump Up the Volume may refer to:

 "Pump Up the Volume" (song) (1987), by M|A|R|R|S
 Pump Up the Volume (film), a 1990 film
 Pump Up the Volume (soundtrack), a soundtrack album from the film

See also 
 Pump Up the Valuum, an album by NOFX